Kota Tua Jakarta (Indonesian for "Jakarta Old Town"), officially known as Kota Tua, is a neighborhood comprising the original downtown area of Jakarta, Indonesia.
 
The site contains Dutch-style structures mostly dated from 17th century, when the port city served as the Asian headquarters of VOC during the heyday of spice trade. It spans 1.3 square kilometres within North Jakarta and West Jakarta (Kelurahan Pinangsia, Taman Sari and Kelurahan Roa Malaka, Tambora). The largely Chinese downtown area of Glodok is a part of Kota Tua.

History

Kota Tua is a remainder of Old Batavia, the first walled settlement of the Dutch in Jakarta area. It was an inner walled city with its own Castle. The area gained importance during the 17th-19th century when it was established as the de facto capital of the Dutch East Indies. This inner walled city contrasted with the surrounding kampung (villages), orchards, and rice fields. Dubbed "The Jewel of Asia" in the 16th century by European sailors, the area was a center of commerce due to its strategic location within the spice trade industry in the archipelago.

Headquarters of the Dutch East India company
In 1526, Fatahillah, sent by Sultanate of Demak, invaded the Hindu Pajajaran's port of Sunda Kelapa, after which he renamed it into Jayakarta. This town was only 15 hectare in size and had a typical Javanese harbor layout. In 1619 the Dutch East India Company (VOC) destroyed Jayakarta under the command of Jan Pieterszoon Coen. A year later the VOC built a new town named "Batavia" after the Batavieren, the supposed Dutch ancestors from antiquity. This city was centered around the east bank of the Ciliwung river, around present day Fatahillah Square. Inhabitants of Batavia are called "Batavianen", later known as "Betawi" people. The creole citizens are descendants of mixed various ethnicities that had inhabited Batavia.

Around 1630 the city expanded towards the west banks of Ciliwung, on the ruins of former Jayakarta. The city was designed according to Dutch urban planning, complete with a fortress (Kasteel Batavia), city wall, public square, churches, canals and tree-lined streets. The city was arranged in several blocks separated by canals. No native Javanese were allowed to live within the city walls, since the authorities were afraid that they might start an insurrection. The planned city of Batavia was completed in 1650. It became the headquarters of the VOC in the East Indies and prospered from the spice trade.

Abandonment

Old Batavia declined in prominence in the late 18th century, probably because  of the canals with their near-stagnant water, together with the warm and humid climate would often cause outbreaks of tropical diseases like malaria. Much of the old town became neglected and abandoned due to its decline of importance, and slowly its canals were filled up. Countryside villas were preferred by wealthier residents, which caused the city to grow southward. This process led to the foundation of an estate named Weltevreden.

As the capital of Dutch East Indies

The city retained its status as the administrative center of the Dutch East Indies when the VOC transferred its possession to the monarch of the Netherlands in 1800.

During the rule of Governor General Daendels in 1808, the city's administration and military were moved south to Weltevreden, with a new planned town center around Koningsplein and Waterlooplein. Due to financial problems however, much of the old town, its wall, and Kasteel Batavia were torn down for construction materials to build new government and civic buildings, such as the Palace of Daendels (now department of Finance) and the Harmonie Society Building (demolished). The only remnant of the area of Kasteel Batavia is Amsterdam Gate, which was completely demolished in 1950.

The city continued to expand further south as epidemics in 1835 and 1870 forced more and more people to move out of the old city to the newer spacious, green and healthier Weltevreden neighborhood. The old city became deserted and was a mere empty shell of its former glory by this period. Old Batavia kept its commercial importance as the city's main harbor and warehouses district, but it was largely overshadowed by Surabaya as the colony's prime harbor and commercial hub.

After the opening of the Tanjung Priok harbor and fueled by the increasing rubber output in the late 19th century, Batavia was able to regain its commercial momentum. There had been attempts to restore the city's old downtown prominence by converting the desolated area into the main business district of Batavia. As a result, the former mansions and shops that at the time had been occupied by ethnic Chinese people, were converted and renovated into offices in the period 1900–1942. Many of these offices can still be seen today around Kali Besar. The development of the business district was hampered by the 1930 Great Depression and the Japanese occupation of Indonesia in 1942.

Post Independent Indonesia

After the recognition of Indonesia's independence in December 1949, the business and banking district of Kota was moved to Thamrin and Kebayoran Baru in the south, thus allowing Kota to further deteriorate again after having regained some of its lost glory. The Banking district of Kota area completely disappeared in the 1980s.

In 1972, the Governor of Jakarta, Ali Sadikin, issued a decree that officially designated the Jakarta Kota Tua area as a heritage site. The governor's decision was necessary in order to preserve the city's architectural roots – or at least what was left of it. Despite the Governor's Decree, Kota Tua remained neglected. Even though the population were pleased by the issuing of the decree, not enough was being done to protect and conserve the legacy from the Dutch colonial era. Many buildings in Kota Tua remain abandoned, and increasing pollution hastened up the dilapidation rate of the old buildings. Some old buildings in Kali Besar were destroyed for development despite the heritage status, such as Hotel Omni Batavia, which was built over an old warehouse.

Restoration and revitalization
The first concrete plan of Kota Tua revitalization was signed in December 2004 by Jakarta Old Town-Kotaku and the government of Jakarta. The commencement of the revitalization plan was started in 2005. Taman Fatahillah Square was revitalized in 2006.

In 2014 the city's governor at that time Joko Widodo continued the restoration plan of Kota Tua. The project, named "Jakarta Old Town Reborn" (JOTR), is a cooperation between state-owned enterprises, the municipal government and the private sector. In March 2014, an event Fiesta Fatahillah was held in Taman Fatahillah Square. The government of Netherlands aided the restoration plan in July 2014. By August 2014, 16 buildings in Kota Tua have been restored, such as the Kota Post Office buildings (built in 1929), which has been converted into a contemporary art museum. Despite these promising developments, most of the city's crumbling colonial architecture remain in ruins up to this day.

Street vendors remain the biggest problem in Kota Tua. Illegal street vendors and hawkers increase dramatically around Kota Tua area, especially during holidays, causing increase in garbage. As of May 2015, 415 street vendors are allowed to sell their items in Kota Tua area.

Notable sites

Nowadays, many remaining historical buildings and architecture are steadily deteriorating, but some of the old buildings have been restored to their former glory. However, there is still much hope in restoring the area, especially with aid from various non-profit organizations, private institutions, and the government all stepping up to the plate to rejuvenate Old Jakarta's legacy. In 2007, several streets surrounding Fatahillah Square such as Pintu Besar street and Pos Kota street, were closed to vehicles as a first step towards the rejuvenation. Since 2014 the old town has a brighter future with the ambitious JOTR project to restore Old Batavia's architecture and putting the site on the UNESCO heritage list.

As an important city and commerce hub in Asia since the 16th century, Oud Batavia is home to several important historical sites and buildings:
 Relic from the Old Batavia
 Café Batavia
 Fine Art and Ceramic Museum (Former Court of Justice)
 Gereja Sion (17th century church, the oldest surviving church in Jakarta, and probably in Indonesia)
 Jakarta History Museum (18th century City Hall of Oud Batavia)
 Glodok and Pinangsia Area (Jakarta Chinatown)
 Kali Besar (original river of Oud Batavia)
 Kota Intan Drawbridge (the only surviving Dutch drawbridge in Indonesia)
 Luar Batang Mosque
 Maritime Museum and Menara Syahbandar (former warehouses of Oud Batavia)
 Pasar Ikan (Fish Market)
 Port of Sunda Kelapa (the original port of Oud Batavia)
 Kim Tek Ie (or Vihara Dharma Bhakti, the oldest Buddhist temple in Jakarta)
 Petak Sembilan Chinese Street Market
 Toko Merah (18th-century mansion of Governor General Baron Van Imhoff)
 Wayang Museum (20th-century former Museum of Oud Batavia marking the site of the tombstone of Coen)
 Hui Tek Bio Temple
 Early 20th-century revitalization
 Bank Indonesia Museum (former Javasche Bank, the main bank of the Dutch East Indies)
 Chartered Bank of India, Australia and China (Now owned by Bank Mandiri)
 Jakarta Kota Post Office (One of a few samples of Nieuwe Zakelijkheid architecture in Indonesia)
 Jakarta Kota railway station (formerly known as BEOS station or Batavia Zuid Station)
 Bank Mandiri Museum (former Netherlands Trading Society, one of a few samples of Nieuwe Zakelijkheid architecture in Indonesia)

List of street names

Most street layout of Kota Tua has not changed since the foundation of Batavia in the 17th century. Below is a list of street names in Kota Tua. The list of street is limited to the street that was at one time located within the walled city of Batavia, both before and after the 1628 and 1629 attack of Batavia by Sultan Agung.

To avoid confusion, the official writing of Roman numeral is converted into Arabic numeral.

Some streets bear the name gracht ("canal"), meaning that it was a canal, e.g. Amsterdamschegracht, Chineeschegracht, etc. When the canal was refilled (mostly around the beginning of the 20th century), the word gedempte ("drained") was added so the name of the street becomes the Gedempte Amsterdamschegracht, Gedempte Chineeschegracht, and so on. To simplify the naming, the list will not contain the word gedempte.

See also 

 Colonial architecture in Jakarta
 Batavia
 Dutch colonial architecture

References

Works cited

External links
 Sahabat Kota Tua

Batavia, Dutch East Indies
North Jakarta
West Jakarta
Tourist attractions in Jakarta
Historic districts